Stadio Virgilio Fedini is a multi-use stadium in San Giovanni Valdarno, Italy.  It is currently used mostly for football matches and is the home ground of A.C. Sangiovannese 1927.  The stadium holds 3,378.

Virgilio Fedini